Stone Street Historic District may refer to:

 Stone Street Historic District, centered around Stone Street (Manhattan), New York City
 Stone Street Historic District (New Hamburg, New York)